Namibia uses regions as its first-level subnational administrative divisions. Since 2013, it has 14 regions which in turn are subdivided into 121 constituencies.

Upon Namibian independence, the pre-existing subdivisions from the South African administration were taken over. Since then, demarcations and numbers of regions and constituencies of Namibia are tabled by delimitation commissions and accepted or declined by the National Assembly.

In 1992, the 1st Delimitation Commission, chaired by Judge President Johan Strydom, proposed that Namibia should be divided into 13 regions. The suggestion was approved in the lower house, The National Assembly. In 2014, the 4th Delimitation Commission amended the number of regions to fourteen.

Regions 1990–1992

See also
Constituencies of Namibia
ISO 3166-2:NA

References

 
Subdivisions of Namibia
Namibia, Regions
Namibia 1
Regions, Namibia
Namibia geography-related lists